Balasubramaniam Neminathan (born 28 March 1922, died before 1984) was a Ceylon Tamil politician who served as a Member of Parliament.

Neminathan was born in March 1922. He stood as the Illankai Tamil Arasu Kachchi's (Federal Party) candidate for Trincomalee at the 1970 parliamentary election. He won the election and entered Parliament. In a 1984 publication by his successor R. Sampanthan, it was noted that B. Neminathan is deceased.

References

1922 births
Year of death missing
Illankai Tamil Arasu Kachchi politicians
Members of the 7th Parliament of Ceylon
People from Eastern Province, Sri Lanka
People from British Ceylon
Sri Lankan Tamil politicians